Timema monikense (originally Timema monikensis) is a parthenogenetic stick insect native to California.

References

Phasmatodea